The North American Rotorwerks Pitbull Ultralight is an American autogyro, designed and produced by North American Rotorwerks of Tukwila, Washington. When it was available the aircraft was supplied as a kit for amateur construction, but by 2013 production had been suspended.

Design and development
It features a single main rotor, a single-seat open cockpit with a windshield, conventional landing gear and a twin cylinder, air-cooled, two-stroke, single-ignition  Rotax 447 engine in tractor configuration. The dual ignition  Rotax 503 and the Subaru EA81 automotive conversion are both optional.

The aircraft fuselage is made from bolted-together square aluminum tubing, with the engine mount made from 6061-T6 aluminium. The down-struts are made from 4130 steel tubing. The landing gear is made from 4130 steel tubing and the tailplane is strut-braced. An electric pre-rotator is standard, while a bubble canopy for year-round flying is optional.

The aircraft is intended to resemble the autogyros of the 1930s and as such it uses a radial engine-style round cowling, rounded rudder, barrel-shaped fuselage and other antique styling details.

Operational history
By January 2013 five examples had been registered in the United States with the Federal Aviation Administration.

Variants
Pitbull Ultralight
Base model with  Rotax 447 or the  Rotax 503 engine. Estimated construction time from the factory-supplied assembly kit is 50 hours.
Pitbull SS
Higher powered model for the Experimental - amateur-built category, with  Rotax 582 or an  Subaru engine. Estimated construction time from the factory-supplied assembly kit is 80 hours.

Specifications (Pitbull Ultralight)

References

External links

2000s United States sport aircraft
Homebuilt aircraft
Single-engined tractor autogyros